Athrips rancidella, the cotoneaster webworm, is a moth of the family Gelechiidae. It is found in most of Europe, except Ireland, the Netherlands, Fennoscandia and the Baltic region. It has also been recorded from Syria, Turkmenistan, Tajikistan and the United States (Oregon and California).

The wingspan is 11–12 mm. Adults have been recorded on wing in June.

The larvae feed on Cotoneaster horizontalis, Prunus spinosa and Crataegus species. The larvae feed on the lower epidermis. They live in a silken tube or tent. The species overwinters as an egg or young larva.

Subspecies
Athrips rancidella rancidella (central and southern Europe, Iran, Syria, Turkmenistan, North America)
Athrips rancidella tadzhika Bidzilya, 2005 (Tajikistan)

References

Moths described in 1854
Athrips
Moths of Europe
Moths of Asia
Moths of North America